Eisa Ahmed (Arabic:عيسى أحمد) (born 13 January 1987) is an Emirati footballer. He currently plays for Masfout as a defender.

External links

References

Emirati footballers
1987 births
Living people
Al Wahda FC players
Al Ahli Club (Dubai) players
Sharjah FC players
Hatta Club players
Masfout Club players
UAE Pro League players
UAE First Division League players
Association football defenders